Events from the year 1674 in Denmark.

Incumbents 

 Monarch - Christian V

Events

Undated 
 Formal diplomatic relations with China.

Births 
 February 28 - Christian Gyldenløve, military officer (died 1703)
 December 5 - Iver Rosenkrantz, statesman and landowner (died 1745)

Full date unknown

Deaths 
 February 13 - Jean de Labadie, pianist 1610)

Full date unknown

References 

 
Denmark
Years of the 17th century in Denmark